The Kosovo Intelligence Agency (KIA; Albanian: Agjencia Kosovare e Inteligjencës, abbr. AKI) is a civilian intelligence agency of Kosovo responsible for providing national security intelligence to senior Kosovo policymakers.

Mission
AKI mission is to identify threats detrimental to the security of Kosovo. A threat to the security of Kosovo shall in any event be considered a threat against the territorial integrity, integrity of the institutions, the constitutional order, the economic stability and development, as well as threats against global security detrimental to Kosovo.

We accomplish this Mission, through collecting and analyzing information about:

Incitement, aiding and abetting or advocating terrorism
Espionage against Kosovo or detrimental to the security of Kosovo
Sabotage directed against Kosovo's vital infrastructure
Organized crime against Kosovo or detrimental to the security of Kosovo in any other way, including money laundering
Inciting the disaffection in security structures
Trafficking of illegal substances, weapons or human beings
Illegal manufacturing or transport of mass destruction weapons, or their components
Illegal trafficking of products and technologies under International Control
Activities that contravene international humanitarian law
Acts of organized violence or intimidation against ethnic or religious groups in Kosovo, and
Matters related to severe threats to public health or safety

Director

References

Government agencies established in 2009
Government of Kosovo
Intelligence agencies